Studio Biederer was a French studio for photography in the time of Art déco, managed by the brothers Jacques Biederer (born 1887; died c. 1942) and Charles Biederer (born 1892; died c. 1942) from Moravská Ostrava, presently in the Czech Republic.

History 

Their father was Maurice (Moritz) Biederer, their mother was Augustine "Gusti" Biederer. Their siblings were their brothers Emanuel and Hugo and their sister Rosa Biederer.

Jacques relocated to Paris in 1908. Charles followed in 1913 to assist him as a photographer. The studio was situated at 33 boulevard du Temple, Paris. Published as Éditions Ostra, their photographs during the 1920s and 30s ranged from artistic nudes to sexual fetish studies including bondage, costumed role play, and erotic corporal punishment. They also produced a series of silent fetish movies depicting scenes of dominance and submission such as Dressage au fouet.

The brothers named the business 'Ostra Studio' in homage to their hometown – Moraska-Ostrava.

Some postcards bear the signature JB, B, Ostra or a question mark in a triangle. Other photos can identified by style, furniture and models. Biederer was a forerunner of later photographers and artists with similar interests such as Charles Guyette, John Willie and Irving Klaw.

During the German occupation the brothers, who were Jewish, were arrested. Charles was deported with transport 4 from Pithiviers transit camp to Auschwitz-Birkenau on 25 June 1942. Jacques was deported with transport 6 from Pithiviers to Birkenau on 17 July 1942.

Gallery

See also 
 Erotic photography
 List of photographers

Literature 

 Alexandre Dupouy: Les éditions Ostra, L'age d'or du fétichisme. Paris: Éditions Astarté, 2007,

References

External links 

 Biederer Studio website

Photography companies of France
Fetish photographers